Yazaman or Yazman, surnamed al-Khadim ("the eunuch") (died 23 October 891) was governor of Tarsus for the Abbasids and chief military leader in the Muslim borderlands with the Byzantine Empire in Cilicia (the ) from 882 to his death in 891. He is celebrated for his raids against the Byzantines.

Life 
Yazaman appears for the first time in September/October 882. At the time he was a servant (mawla) of al-Fath ibn Khaqan, and was attacked and imprisoned by the governor of the Cilician borderlands, Khalaf al-Farghani, who had been appointed by Ahmad ibn Tulun, the autonomous ruler of Egypt and Syria. Yazaman was freed by the local people, who then rose up and rejected Tulunid rule, appointing Yazaman as their leader instead and returning to Abbasid allegiance. Ibn Tulun then marched on Tarsus, but the inhabitants opened the sluice gates and flooded the plain around the city, forcing Ibn Tulun to return to Damascus without achieving anything.

In 883, Yazaman faced a large Byzantine army sent against Tarsus, under the command of the Domestic of the Schools, Kesta Stypeiotes. Yazaman attacked the Byzantine camp at Bab Qalamyah, some 12 km from Tarsus, during the night of 11 September, catching the Byzantines by surprise. The Byzantine forces scattered, Stypeiotes and the strategoi of Anatolikon and Cappadocia were killed, and much booty was captured. Yazaman led a major naval raid soon thereafter against the fortress of Euripos (Chalkis), comprising 30 large ships (of the type called  in Greek), but it was beaten off with great loss by the local governor of Hellas, Oineiates. The historian al-Tabari records that Yazaman also led a land raid in January/February 886 up to al-Maskanin (unidentified), and returned to Tarsus with no casualties but with much booty and captives. Probably in the summer of the same year, he also led a naval raid that captured four Byzantine ships.

Despite his earlier opposition to them, in 890 Yazaman swore allegiance to the Tulunids, under Ibn Tulun's son Khumarawayh. On 4 October 891, a Tulunid officer, Ahmad ibn Tughan al-Ujayfi, arrived at Tarsus. Together with him, Yazaman led another raid against Byzantine territories. The Muslims laid siege to the Byzantine fortress of Salandu, but on 22 October Yazaman was wounded by a stone thrown by a catapult. This caused the Muslims to break off the siege, and he died on the next day on the way back. His troops carried him to Tarsus, and buried him at the "Gate of Jihad". He was succeeded by Ahmad ibn Tughan al-Ujayfi. Tarsus remained under Tulunid control until 897, when it was recovered by the Abbasids.

Yazaman's death was a keenly felt loss for the Muslims, who considered him one of their most valiant champions, alongside Umar al-Aqta and Ali al-Armani. The Arab sources report that the mariners under his command were renowned for their boldness. According to the 10th-century account of al-Mas'udi (The Meadows of Gold, VIII, 74–75) a Greek convert to Islam reported to him that Yazaman was among the ten illustrious Muslims whose portraits were displayed in some Byzantine churches in recognition of their valour.

References

Sources

 

 

891 deaths
Abbasid people of the Arab–Byzantine wars
Abbasid governors of Tarsus
Eunuchs of the Abbasid Caliphate
Generals of the Abbasid Caliphate
Year of birth unknown
Admirals of the Abbasid Caliphate
9th-century people from the Abbasid Caliphate
Tulunid governors
Deaths by projectile weapons